Jane Doe is a 2001 American made-for-television action thriller film starring Teri Hatcher and Rob Lowe directed and written by Kevin Elders.

Plot summary
Jane Doe (Hatcher) is the real name of arms manufacturer Cy-Kor's recently fired security password employee with top clearance, whose teenage son Michael (Trevor Blumas) is kidnapped. She obeys the bizarre instructions, including getting and learning to use a gun and downloading a secret file (after which her work post starts totally deleting), dumping both in a dumpster and waiting nearby, only to witness the company's CEO Churnings being shot by a sniper using an identical weapon. Michael is released, but the pair is now wanted for the murder and both are abducted by armed men, who bring them to a ranch. There they are welcomed by Michael's father, David Doe (Lowe), who discloses to be an agent of the Defense Intelligence Agency (DIA), and so is Michael, who used her clearance as the whole thing is a sting for the kidnapping and murder's brain, Avery (Mark Caven) so he will sell the enemy false data. Alas David's DIA-partner Kurt Simmons and their boss Phelps have a dirty agenda...

2001 television films
2001 films
2001 action thriller films
American action thriller films
Action television films
American thriller television films
Films scored by Brian Tyler
USA Network original films
2000s American films